Sher Singhwala  is a village in Bhulath Tehsil in Kapurthala district of Punjab State, India. It was established by Sher Singh Khaira, some time in the late 1800s, who owned the farm land. The village is administrated by a Sarpanch who is an elected representative of village as per the constitution of India and Panchayati raj (India).

Demography 
According to the report published by Census India in 2011,Sher Singhwala has 74 houses with the total population of 389 persons of which 200 are male and 189 females. Literacy rate of Sher Singhwala is 80.17%, higher than the state average of 75.84%.  The population of children in the age group 0–6 years is 36 which is 9.25% of the total population.  Child sex ratio is approximately 714, lower than the state average of 846.

Population data 

As per census 2011, 130 people were engaged in work activities out of the total population of Sher Singhwala which includes 119 males and 11 females. According to census survey report 2011,  99.23% workers (Employment or Earning more than 6 Months) describe their work as main work and 0.77% workers are involved in Marginal activity providing livelihood for less than 6 months.

Caste 
The village has schedule caste (SC) constitutes 25.45% of total population of the village and it doesn't have any Schedule Tribe (ST) population.

References

List of cities near the village 
Bhulath
Kapurthala 
Phagwara 
Sultanpur Lodhi

Air travel connectivity 
The closest International airport to the village is Sri Guru Ram Dass Jee International Airport.

External links
 Villages in Kapurthala
 List of Villages in Kapurthala Tehsil

Villages in Kapurthala district